Guangnan Circuit or Guangnan Province was a short-lived circuit during the early Song dynasty, corresponding to the former Southern Han territory after Southern Han was annexed by Song in 971. In 988, Guangnan Circuit was divided into Guangnan East Circuit and Guangnan West Circuit.

References
 

Circuits of the Song dynasty
Former circuits in Guangdong
Former circuits in Guangxi